Anthony DiDonato, Jr. (January 11, 1911 – May 10, 1989) is a former Democratic member of the Pennsylvania House of Representatives.

References

Democratic Party members of the Pennsylvania House of Representatives
1989 deaths
1911 births
20th-century American politicians